Mathew Vattackuzhy (2 February 1930 – 22 November 2016) was a Syro-Malabar bishop.

Ordained to the priesthood in 1956, Vattackuzhy served as bishop of the Syro-Malabar Catholic Eparchy of Kanjirappally. India, from 1986 to 2000.

Notes

1930 births
2016 deaths
Syro-Malabar bishops